Tulsi Devi Rai is a Sikkim Democratic Front politician from Sikkim. She was elected in Sikkim Legislative Assembly election in 2009 and 2014 from Melli constituency as candidate of Sikkim Democratic Front. She was minister of Water Security, Public Health Engineering, Social Justice, Empowerment & Welfare Departments in the Fifth Chamling ministry from 2014 to 2019.

References 

Living people
Sikkim MLAs 2009–2014
Sikkim MLAs 2014–2019
Sikkim Democratic Front politicians
Year of birth missing (living people)
People from Gyalshing district
Rai people